The Thymelaeaceae  are a cosmopolitan family of flowering plants composed of 50 genera (listed below) and 898 species. It was established in 1789 by Antoine Laurent de Jussieu. The Thymelaeaceae are mostly trees and shrubs, with a few vines and herbaceous plants.

Description
This is not intended as a full botanical description, but only as a few notes on some of the conspicuous or unusual traits of the family when Tepuianthus is excluded. The bark is usually shiny and fibrous. Attempts to break the stem often result in a strip of bark peeling down the side. The number of stamens is usually once or twice the number of calyx lobes. If twice, then they often occur in two well separated series. Exceptions include Gonystylus, which may have up to 100 stamens, and Pimelea, which has only 1 or 2. The floral tube appears to be a calyx or corolla, but is actually a hollow receptacle. This feature is probably unique to Thymelaeaceae. The sepals are mounted on the rim of the floral tube. Stamens may be mounted on the rim or inside. What appear to be petals are actually stipular appendages of the sepals. The fruit is a 1-seeded berry or an achene. The 1-seeded berries have often been mistaken for drupes whenever the seed coat was mistaken for an endocarp.

When using a key to the families of flowering plants, Thymelaeaceae are often difficult or impossible to recognize because of equivocal interpretation of the flower parts. Sepals, petals, and staminodes are hard to distinguish, and many keys are ambiguous about whether staminodes should be counted as stamens. Moreover, in Wikstroemia, individual plants often produce anomalous flowers. In these, the nonfunctional organs are much deformed and bear little resemblance to the parts that they represent.

A good collection of pictures of plants in this family has appeared in a scientific paper.

Taxonomy
The family is named for the genus Thymelaea, the name of which is a combination of the Greek name for the herb thyme θύμος (thúmos) and that for the olive ἐλαία (elaía) - in reference to its thyme-like foliage (i.e. minuscule leaves) and olive-like fruit.

Classification
The Thymelaeaceae are in the order Malvales. Except for a sister relationship with Tepuianthaceae, little is known for sure about their relationships with the other families in the order.

Unlike most recent authors, who recognize four subfamilies, B.E. Herber has divided Thymelaeaceae into two subfamilies. He has retained the subfamily Gonostyloideae, but renamed it Octolepidoideae. The other three traditional subfamilies (Synandrodaphnoideae, Aquilarioideae, and Thymelaeoideae) were combined into a Thymelaeoideae s.l.(sensu lato), and reduced to tribal rank, as Synandrodaphneae, Aquilarieae, and Daphneae, respectively. No tribes were designated in subfamily Octolepidoideae, but it was provisionally divided into two informal groups, the Octolepis group and the Gonystylus group. Likewise, no subtribes were designated in the tribe Daphneae, but it was informally divided into four groups: the Linostoma group, the Daphne group, the Phaleria group, and the Gnidia group. The 45 genera recognized by Herber are grouped as follows. Three genera in Daphneae were placed incertae sedis (not assigned to any particular group or in a separate group by themselves).

Octolepidoideae 
Octolepis group: Arnhemia, Deltaria, Lethedon, Octolepis, Solmsia
Gonystylus group: Aetoxylon, Amyxa, Gonystylus

Thymelaeoideae 
Synandrodaphneae: Synandrodaphne
Aquilarieae: Aquilaria, Gyrinops
Daphneae

Linostoma group: Craterosiphon, Dicranolepis, Enkleia, Jedda, Linostoma, Lophostoma, Synaptolepis
Phaleria group: Peddiea, Phaleria
Daphne group: Daphne, Daphnopsis, Diarthron, Dirca, Edgeworthia, Funifera, Goodallia, Lagetta, Ovidia, Rhamnoneuron, Schoenobiblus, Stellera, Thymelaea, Wikstroemia
Gnidia group: Dais, Drapetes, Gnidia, Kelleria, Lachnaea, Passerina, Pimelea, Struthiola
Incertae sedis: Linodendron, Stephanodaphne, Lasiadenia

Phylogeny 
The first molecular phylogeny for Thymelaeaceae was published in 2002. It was based on 2 regions of chloroplast DNA. These were the rbcL gene and the intergenic spacer between the transfer RNA genes trnL and trnF. Forty one species in the family were sampled. In 2008, Marline Rautenbach performed a phylogenetic study in which 143 species in the family were sampled. The sampling in this study was concentrated in the Gnidia group, but the sampling in the rest of the family was as extensive as in the previous study, or more so. In addition to rbcL and trnL-F data, sequences of the ITS (internal transcribed spacer) region of nrDNA (nuclear ribosomal DNA) were used. All of the clades that were strongly supported in the previous study were recovered with even stronger statistical support.

The tree below is an excerpt from the Rautenbach (2002) phylogeny. The species of Gnidia were chosen from among the most common or well known species in a way that shows which clades contain species of Gnidia.

Defining the genera

The circumscription of genera in Thymelaeaceae has always been especially difficult, and is to some degree artificial. For example, the difficulty of distinguishing Daphne from Wikstroemia has been commented upon by Rautenbach and Herber. Several small genera are probably embedded in Daphne or Wikstroemia, or if Daphne and Wikstroemia are intermingled, these small genera might be embedded in both simultaneously. Stellera, for example, is nested within Wikstroemia, at least (see the phylogenetic tree below).

A recent comparison of DNA sequences has established the monophyly of Thymelaea and the polyphyly of Diarthron, but there was not sufficient sampling in Wikstroemia and Daphne to exclude the possibility that Thymelaea, Diarthron, and others might be embedded in them.

The large genus Gnidia is polyphyletic and its species fall into 4 separate clades, each of which contains other genera of the family (see the phylogenetic tree below). The type species for Gnidia is Gnidia pinifolia. If Gnidia is divided into 4 or more separate genera, the segregate genus which contains G. pinifolia will retain the name Gnidia. Zachary S. Rogers published a revision of the Gnidia of Madagascar in 2009 in Annals of the Missouri Botanical Garden.

Some of the older treatments of Thymelaeaceae recognize Lasiosiphon as a separate genus from Gnidia. This distinction was later shown to be artificial. However, Van der Bank et al. (2002) suggested that Lasiosiphon might be resurrected if redefined. The type species for Lasiosiphon is Gnidia glauca, formerly known as Lasiosiphon glaucus.

Open questions
Rautenbach used different names from Herber for some of the groups and placed some of the groups at different taxonomic rank, but her phylogeny supports Herber's classification with the few exceptions noted below. The only strongly supported difference (99% (bootstrap percentage)  from Herber's classification was that Dais was found to be sister to Phaleria. The phylogeny casts significant doubt upon the monophyly of the subfamily Octolepidoideae, and upon the monophyly of the informal Octolepis and Gonostylus groups, but this result had only weak statistical support. Only a sampling of more species and more DNA from each will determine whether these groups are monophyletic or not. Stephanodaphne and Peddiea might need to be transferred to the Gnidia group, but support was not strong (60% BP) for a clade consisting of the Gnidia group with Stephanodaphne and Peddiea. Again, more extensive sampling will be required to resolve this question. Two of the 3 genera placed incertae sedis by Herber (Linodendron and Lasiadenia) have not yet been sampled and their relationships to other genera remain obscure.

Genera

Herber (2003) recognized 45 genera, excluding Tepuianthus from the family, sinking Atemnosiphon and Englerodaphne into Gnidia, Eriosolena into Daphne, and Thecanthes into Pimelea. The largest genera and the approximate number of species in each are Gnidia (160), Pimelea (110), Daphne (95), Wikstroemia (70), Daphnopsis (65), Struthiola (35), Lachnaea (30), Thymelaea (30), Phaleria (30), and Gonystylus (25).

, 50+ genera are accepted by the World Checklist of Thymelaceae:

In the past, different authors have defined Thymelaeaceae in different ways. For example, John Hutchinson excluded Gonystylus and its close relatives, as well as Aquilaria and its close relatives from the family, forming 2 segregate families: Gonystylaceae and Aquilariaceae. But today, the only controversy that still remains over the circumscription of the family is the question of whether Tepuianthus should be included, or segregated as a separate, monogeneric family. Stevens includes Tepuianthus, but Kubitzki treats Tepuianthaceae as a separate family.

Distribution
The family is more diverse in the Southern Hemisphere than in the Northern, with major concentrations of species in Africa and Australia. The genera are overwhelmingly African.

Ethnobotany and economic use

Several genera are of economic importance. Gonystylus (Ramin) is valued for its comparatively soft, easily worked yellowish wood, but trade in all species in the genus are controlled by CITES. Many genera have inner bark yielding strong fibre suitable for the making of cordage and paper - a fact actually acknowledged in the naming of one of the genera, Funifera being the Latin for "bearer (provider) of rope". The barks of Daphne, Edgeworthia, Rhamnoneuron, Thymelaea, Stellera, and Wikstroemia are used in paper-making, while Lagetta species are known as lacebark for their lacelike inner bark, the attractive appearance of which has led to their being used to make clothing and other utilitarian objects.

Toxicity and medicinal uses

Many of the species (e.g. Wikstroemia indica and Stellera chamaejasme) have actual or potential uses in medicine and are poisonous if eaten, acting as violent purges (e.g. Daphne mezereum), this toxicity often being related to the plants' containing phorbol esters which, as the name suggests, are also common in the spurge family Euphorbiaceae.

Use as ornamental plants

Daphne is grown (despite the high toxicity of its attractive fruits) for its sweetly scented flowers. Species of Wikstroemia, Daphne, Phaleria, Dais, Pimelea and other genera are grown as ornamentals.

Gallery

References

External links 

 Zachary S. Rogers (2009 onwards). A Worldwide Checklist of Thymelaeaceae (version 1).
 Angiosperm Phylogeny Peter F. Stevens (2001 onwards) In: Missouri Botanical Garden
 Rautenbach(2008) in: UJDigiSpace @ The University of Johannesburg 
 distribution  in: Gnidia is not monophyletic: taxonomic implications for Gnidia and its relatives in Thymelaeoideae
Thymelaeaceae of Mongolia in FloraGREIF

 
Malvales families